Abdilahi Nassir (1 June 1932 – 11 January 2022) was a Kenyan Shia cleric based in Mombasa. Though raised a Sunni, Nassir converted to Shiism, and in the wake of Iran's Islamic revolution publicly identified himself as Twelver Shia.

Early life and education 
Sheikh Abdillahi Nassir was born in Mombasa on 1 June 1932. His early education commenced with Madrasah education as he enrolled in Madrasah at a young age of four years and continued attending Madrasah from 1936 to 1946. At the same time, he had normal school education, attending the Arab Boys Primary School from 1941 to 1949, and later joined the Zanzibar’s Bet-el-Ras Teacher Training College from 1950 to 1951.

While in Zanzibar, he utilized his spare time in seeking more guidance and counsels through intensive training, under the auspices of a renowned scholar; Sayyid Omar Abdallah, who not only taught him but also inspired him a lot in his understanding of Islam.

After completing his studies in Zanzibar, he moved back to Mombasa. However, he assiduously continued seeking counsels and guidance from Sayyid Omar Abdallah, his mentor.

He later was again blessed with yet another astounding Muslim revolutionary thinker, Sheikh Muhammad Abdallah Ghazali. Sheikh Ghazali taught him how to think. He used to probe difficult questions to jolt and provoke Sheikh Abdilahi Nassir's thinking.

Early career 
Upon his return to Mombasa he taught at the Arab Primary School from 1951 to 1954. Because of his health condition, he was medically boarded out.
Recovering from his ailment, he then joined the Mombasa Institute of Muslim Education as an accounts clerk and as a part-time religious Instructor, from 1955 to 1957.
 

Sheikh Abdillahi Nassir took active interest in pre independence Kenya politics from 1957 to 1963. He was elected to Kenya’s pre-independence Legislative Council and served in this capacity from 1961 to 1963. As a member of the Kenya Legislative Council, he also attended the historic Kenya Constitutional Conference held at the Lancaster House, London, in 1963.  
 

On 28 December 1961, Sheikh Abdilahi Nassir was appointed, by the minister for education (at that time), Mr. Daniel Toroitich Arap Moi, as one of the members in the Bursary Selection Board to advise the ministry on the award, renewal or variation of bursaries for a period of three years.

He was then appointed as one of the members of the Advisory Council on Arab Education, by the Minister of Education (at that time), Mr. Lawrence George Sagini, on 5 October 1962.

From 1964 to 1965, he was a full-time politician as member of KANU's executive council (Coast Province).

He then worked as an Arabic/Swahili monitor with the BBC in Nairobi from 1965-1967.

Later, he joined the Oxford University Press and worked as a Swahili Editor with the Eastern Africa Branch of Oxford University Press in Nairobi from 1967 to 1975. He was the first Swahili Editor to be recruited (at OUP). Nassir played a key role in seeing Julius Nyerere's Swahili translations of Julius Caesar (Julius Kaisari) and The Merchant of Venice (Mabepari wa Venisi) through publication. In 1969, he moved to the Dar es Salam office, where he is credited, together with the manager (Lucius Thonya), with developing the important and lucrative Swahili publishing programme there. These projects meant that OUP was well placed to respond to the demand created by Julius Nyerere's 'Education for Self Reliance' and the introduction of Swahili as a teaching medium in Tanzanian schools.

In 1975, Sheikh Abdillahi left the Oxford University Press to form his own Shungwaya Publishers Ltd.

In 1977 he was recalled by the Oxford University Press to head the Eastern Africa Branch as General Manager and served in this capacity from 1977 to 1980.

Nassir's positions have included serving as the principal of the Shia Theological Seminary near Mombasa, and his role in the Coastal People's Party. He attended several meetings in Lancaster House to liberate Kenyans from the colonial rulers. He later on left politics after independence for not being pleased by politics of that time.

Tabligh 
Despite being active in Kenyan politics, Nassir devoted part time in preaching and tabligh activities from 1954 to 1959. During 1960-1980, he engaged in translating and commenting on the Qur’an during the months of Ramadan while living in Mombasa (1960–64) and later when he settled in Nairobi (1965–1980).

From 1978 to 1980, he worked as East Africa Representative of the Jeddah based WAMY (World Assembly of Muslim Youths).

With his intellectual knack, Nassir did not blindly follow the widely held common perceptions about the Shia faith. The spirit of inquiry led him to read books written by Shia scholars. At the same time, he interacted with members of the Shia community with a view to understanding the Shia faith better. In due course, he showed growing leanings towards the Shia faith and his question/answer sessions on the Kenya Broadcasting Corporation’s radio programs from 1977 to 1980 aroused much interest.

Upon his return to Mombasa in the early 1980s, he was a regular lecturer for the Muharram Majalis organized by the Bilal Muslim Mission of Kenya held at the Huseini Imambargah.

Among other speakers for the Muharram majalis were Sharif Khitamy, Sharif Badawy, Prof. Bakari of Nairobi University and a number of other Sunni scholars from Mombasa and Lamu. When the Bilal Muslim Mission of Kenya Assembly Hall was formally opened in 1988, Swahili majalis for the months Muharram and additional lecture series were then held at the Bilal Hall. Nassir would be among the main speakers attracting good crowd.

In due course, he declared himself as a practicing Shia Ithna-Asheri.

Through the Bilal media section, Nassir recorded various talks which have been broadcast in special radio and television programs, organized by the Bilal Muslim Mission of Kenya. At the same time, Tabligh Section of the Dar es Salaam Jamaat and the Al Itrah Foundation of Dar-es-Salaam also extended similar cooperation to Nassir.

In addition to Tanzania, community members and organizations in India, Pakistan, United Kingdom, United States, Canada, and the West Indies invited Nassir for lecture tours since he was able to deliver lectures in both English and Kiswahili.

Nassir wrote and co-wrote several books and booklets on Kiswahili language, (seven in all) and on Islam, (twenty), some of which have been translated into English and Rwandese.

Sheikh Abdilahi Nassir’s vision was to inspire a healthier community by creating a platform (Ahlul Bayt Centre) for the people to connect, motivate and educate each other. To this end, in 2001, he established Ahlul Bayt Centre, a non-political, non-sectarian, multi-purpose voluntary Community-based organization that combines lobbying, raising of public awareness, and practical work to ensure education, personal growth and healthier communities. The organization aims at empowering the community to their maximum potential by creating a sense of cooperation, integration and unity among the people and motivate the youth to take better participation in developing the community.

In the same year, he set up a free reading library in Mombasa (Ahlul Bayt Centre Library) and donated his books, to the library.

Latterly he was focussed on Swahili translation and commentary of the Qur'an, and working to project the Shia Ithna-Asheri outlook.

Death
Nassir died on Tuesday, 11 January 2022, at the age of 89, in Mombasa, Kenya.

Commemoration ceremonies were held, to honor him, in different parts of the world, including Kenya, Tanzania, Zanzibar, Indonesia, Iran, United Kingdom and many others.

Kenyan Politicians eulogised Nassir as a revered scholar who was at the forefront in fighting for independence.

Kenya's Deputy President, at that time, William Ruto eulogised him as "an academic giant, an astute political thinker and a faithful force for development who made a huge contribution to the aspirations of the Coastal Region. We celebrate the exceptional life that he led and the rich legacy that he leaves behind."

Kenya's Cabinet Secretary for Tourism, Najib Balala, eulogised him as "a Swahili activist, and a leader at the forefront in fighting for Kenya's freedom against the British rule, resulting in Kenya’s independence."

Mombasa's Governor Hassan Ali Joho eulogised him as "a highly revered scholar, a literary genius and  a man of impeccable character. He was one of Mombasa's favourite sons, a true patriot, highly respected globally and stood out as a humble father figure and an inspiration  to many."

Hassan Omar Hassan, Kenyan politician who served as Mombasa Senator between 2013 and 2017, eulogised him as "a towering figure in our politics and scholarship, the impact he has had on our region and society is immense and will live on. I will greatly miss Sheikh Abdillahi. A thinker, an orator, an astute politician, a scholar and a mentor to me and many."

Suleiman Shahbal, Kenyan politician and businessman, upon hearing Nassir's sad demise said: "I am saddened by the demise of Sheikh Abdillahi Nassir, an eminent elder in Mombasa. Sheikh Abdillahi diligently served our community as a teacher and through his wisdom and knowledge which he never hesitated to share at all times. He also served as a member of the Kenya Legislative Council. Mzee Abdillahi also helped push the education agenda within our community, an effort that also saw his children and grandchildren develop an amazing interest in education."

Yusuf Hassan, the Member of Parliament for Kamukunji Constituency, eulogised him as "a progressive Islamic scholar, political leader & writer, who fought for freedom, equality and justice."

During a commemoration ceremony, held online and in person on Tuesday, January 18, 2022, many Islamic scholars eulogised Sheikh Abdilahi Nassir including:

Hojat al-Islam Sayed Morteza Morteza Al-Ameli, who was quoted saying, "I found Sheikh Abdillahi Nasir a noble scholar, a distinguished writer, and a humble man who spent most of his time serving the religion. He was a strong preacher who was invited to speak in mosques on various occasions. He was revered by scholars in various East African countries and was a prominent figure in the Islamic world"

Hojat al-Islam Mohammad Salim, a Shiite missionary in Kenya, also said, “Every time I went to East Africa as a missionary, I met Sheikh Abdillahi Nasir, and he treated me as if I were a great scholar. This eminent scholar, despite his great knowledge, respected others and listened to their words.”

Hojat al-Islam Sayed Mohammad Shahedi, the former director of the representation of Al-Mustafa International University, added, “Sheikh Abdillahi Nasir was a humble and virtuous man who promoted Shia among the youth of Kenya and many parts of East Africa... Every time I traveled to Tanzania, I met Sheikh Abdullahi Nasser, and I found him a humble and smiling man who warmly welcomed his guests”

Awards

On 22 December 2006, Sheikh Abdilahi Nassir was among the 17 Kenyans who were honoured with the Freedom of the City of Nairobi Award. The award was issued to senior citizens who attended the Lancaster House conference, in the United Kingdom, which gave birth to the Constitution for Independent Kenya.

In April 2011 at the 72nd Supreme Council Session in Mombasa, the then Africa Federation Chairman Alhaj Anwarali Dharamsi bestowed the Abbasi Medal to Sheikh Abdillahi Nassir in recognition of his long outstanding, honorable and dedicated services in the cause of Islam and for propagating the madh’hab of Ahlul Bayt (‘A).

Selected works
A Concise Dictionary of English-Swahili Idioms
Tamrini za kiswahili: sarufi na matumizi (pamoja na majibu)
Kamusi Sanifu Ya Msingi. Oxford University Press. .
Al-Battar: Sherehe ya Dhul Faqaar

Sura Al-Faatiha: Tafsiri na Maelezo. Ahlul Bayt Centre.

References

1932 births
2022 deaths
Converts to Shia Islam from Sunni Islam
Critics of Sunni Islam
Kenyan Shia clerics
Kenyan Shia Muslims
People from Mombasa
Twelvers